was a town located in Kayabe District, Oshima Subprefecture, Hokkaido, Japan.

As of 2004, the town had an estimated population of 4,857 and a density of 85.44 persons per km2. The total area was 56.85 km2.

On April 1, 2005, Sawara was merged into the expanded town of Mori and no longer exists as an independent municipality.

External links
 Town website for Mori 

Dissolved municipalities of Hokkaido